Horse&Rider (also Horse&Rider Magazine) is a newstrade and subscription magazine published in the United Kingdom by DJ Murphy.

It is issued 13 times per year and features "riding and practical advice for your horse."  It is claimed to be one of the UK's leading equestrian magazines for riders and horse owners.

History
The magazine was founded by David J. Murphy in 1950, under the title Showjumping then Light Horse.  After decades as Light Horse, in 1981 the title was changed to Horse&Rider.

References

External links
 Official website

1950 establishments in the United Kingdom
Monthly magazines published in the United Kingdom
Sports magazines published in the United Kingdom
Equine magazines
Horses in the United Kingdom
Magazines established in 1950